Major District Road 82, is a District Road in Jalandhar District in the state of Punjab in India. This road is also named by Jalandhar Nurmahal Highway.

Route description
The route of the highway is Jalandhar Cantonment-Jamsher-Jandiala-Nurmahal-Talwan.

References

Roads in Punjab, India